Werewolf: Conspicuous Consumption is a novel written by Stewart Wieck under the pseudonym Stewart von Allmen, published by Boxtree Books in 1995.

Plot summary
Werewolf: Conspicuous Consumption is a Werewolf: The Apocalypse novel in which a group werewolves has been formed into a pack, defending a small cairn near the Midwestern town of Little River.

Reception
Andy Butcher reviewed Werewolf: Conspicuous Consumption for Arcane magazine, rating it a 5 out of 10 overall. Butcher comments that "It's not that Conspicuous Consumption is a bad book - it's just not a great one."

Reviews
Review by John D. Owen (1996) in Vector 189

References

1995 novels
Werewolf: The Apocalypse
World of Darkness novels